Xue Fei (Chinese: 薛飞; Pinyin: Xuē Fēi; born 8 August 1989 in Shandong) is a female Chinese long-distance runner who specializes in the 5000 metres.

She won the 2006 World Junior Championships and the 2006 Asian Games. She also competed at the 2008 World Indoor Championships without reaching the final. She will represent her country at the 2008 Summer Olympics.

Personal bests
1500 metres - 4:08.87 min (2008)
5000 metres - 15:02.73 min (2007)
10,000 metres - 32:29.12 min (2007)

References

Team China 2008

1989 births
Living people
People from Heze
Runners from Shandong
Chinese female long-distance runners
Olympic athletes of China
Athletes (track and field) at the 2008 Summer Olympics
Asian Games gold medalists for China
Asian Games medalists in athletics (track and field)
Athletes (track and field) at the 2006 Asian Games
Athletes (track and field) at the 2010 Asian Games
Medalists at the 2006 Asian Games